Sunday Creek may refer to:

Sunday Creek (Ohio), a tributary of the Hocking River in southeastern Ohio, United States
Sunday Creek (Green River tributary), a stream in Washington, United States

See also
Sunday River (disambiguation)